Rupirana is a genus of frogs in the family Leptodactylidae. It is monotypic, being represented by the singles species Rupirana cardosoi. The specific name cardosoi honors Adão José Cardoso, a Brazilian herpetologist. It is endemic to northern Espinhaço Mountains, Bahia, Brazil.
Its natural habitats are banks of small streams in high-altitude (about  asl) grassy vegetation. It is threatened by habitat loss. Part of the range is within the Chapada Diamantina National Park.

References

Leptodactylidae
Monotypic amphibian genera
Amphibians of Brazil
Endemic fauna of Brazil
Amphibians described in 1999
Taxonomy articles created by Polbot